Sowerby's beaked whale (Mesoplodon bidens), also known as the North Atlantic or North Sea beaked whale, is a species of toothed whale. It was the first mesoplodont whale to be described. James Sowerby, an English naturalist and artist, first described the species in 1804 from a skull obtained from a male that had stranded in the Moray Firth, Scotland, in 1800. He named it bidens, which derives from the two teeth present in the jaw, now known to be a very common feature among the genus.

Physical description

Sowerby's beaked whale has a typical body shape for the genus, and is mainly distinguished by the male's dual teeth positioned far back in the mouth. The whale's beak is moderately long, and the melon is slightly convex. The colouration pattern is a grey with light countershading on the bottom, and frequently has cookie cutter shark bites and scars from teeth (in males). The whale reaches 5 metres (16 ft) in females and 5.5 metres (18 ft) in males, with a weight of 1000-1300 kilograms (2200-2900 lb). The gestation period lasts for 12 months and the young are born at a length of 2.4 to 2.7 metres (8 to 9 ft) with a weight of around 185 kilograms (400 lb).

Diet
The diet of Sowerby's beaked whales consists of squid and small fish.

Population and distribution
Sowerby's beaked whale ranges from Nantucket to Labrador in the western North Atlantic and from Madeira to the Norwegian Sea in the eastern North Atlantic. They typically range in waters 200 to 1,500 metres (650 to 5,000 ft) deep. No population estimates have been made. In 1991, there were about 90 records of the species, 80 from the eastern North Atlantic and less than ten from the western North Atlantic; the majority of the records are from around the British Isles.

On 10 January 2009, a female Sowerby's beaked whale was found at the port of Fethiye on the Aegean coast of Turkey, far away from her natural habitat. The whale was successfully saved and released back to the open sea.

On 25 July 2015, biologists with the New England Aquarium investigated the death of a beaked whale in Massachusetts. Biologists from the aquarium and the International Fund for Animal Welfare said they would perform a necrospy at the Woods Hole Oceanographic Institution. The whale was initially identified as a Sowerby's beaked whale, but the aquarium said a more thorough examination and consultation with additional experts was needed as staff had not seen a beaked whale since 2006.

On 26 October 2018, a  whale was found beached near the town of Saltdean, on the UK coast. The carcass was subsequently taken to the Natural History Museum, London for post-mortem. On 29 August 2019, a stranded whale was rescued from Dungarvan Bay, in southeast Ireland. On the 4th July 2020, a whale became disorientated and strayed into Wicklow, harbour on the east coast of Ireland but was later discovered dead on Wicklow, beach.

On 21 August 2020, a 3.86-metre (12.66 ft) female Sowerby's beaked whale washed up on the shore of a beach in Caister-on-Sea, Norfolk. Emergency services assisted the whale out to sea in an attempt to encourage the animal to live. Unfortunately the next morning a report was received to suggest the whale was stranded and deceased at Lowestoft, on the UK coast, following reported sights of 2 whales in the nearby towns of Brancaster and Blakeney in Norfolk earlier in the month.

On successive days in October 2020, two Sowerby's Beaked whales were washed up on separate beaches in East Lothian. Both animals died. Post-mortems are due to be carried out by the National Museum of Scotland.

Behaviour

Sowerby's beaked whales are reclusive creatures that stay away from ships and are rarely sighted. The whales are occasionally in groups of 8 to 10 individuals (males, females, and calves) and have been known to strand in groups as well. They are believed to primarily feed on squid and molluscs, but cod has also been found in their stomachs. They have been known to dive down at times approaching 30 minutes.

Conservation

The species has been hunted infrequently by Norwegians, but such practices have long since been abandoned. There are some deaths due to entanglement in fishing gear, but it is unlikely to be very damaging to the species. Sowerby's beaked whale is covered by the Agreement on the Conservation of Small Cetaceans of the Baltic, North East Atlantic, Irish and North Seas (ASCOBANS) and the Agreement on the Conservation of Cetaceans in the Black Sea, Mediterranean Sea and Contiguous Atlantic Area (ACCOBAMS). The species is further included in the Memorandum of Understanding Concerning the Conservation of the Manatee and Small Cetaceans of Western Africa and Macaronesia (Western African Aquatic Mammals MoU).

See also

List of cetaceans

Notes

References

 
Encyclopedia of Marine Mammals. Edited by William F. Perrin, Bernd Wursig, and J.G.M Thewissen. Academic Press, 2002. 
Sea Mammals of the World. Written by Randall R. Reeves, Brent S. Steward, Phillip J. Clapham, and James A. Owell. A & C Black, London, 2002.

External links

Cetaceans of the World
CMS
Sowerby's beaked whale movie, text in French
Whale & Dolphin Conservation Society (WDCS)

Mesoplodont whales
Cetaceans of the Atlantic Ocean
Fauna of Scandinavia
Mammals described in 1804